is a Japanese TV drama with 11 episodes aired from July 2, 2006, to September 10, 2006, on TBS channel, and tells the story of the members of an unusual family with a stay-at-home father and a working mother.

Kazutoyo Kamon is a Stay-at-home dad. His wife Chiyo is a lawyer.

Cast
Masakazu Tamura as Kazutoyo Kamon
Yuki Uchida as Yuki Kamon
Tetsuji Tamayama as Akira Kamon
Mitsuki Nagashima as Kaoru Kamon
Ran Ito as Chiyo Kamon
Satomi Kobayashi as Kozue Tsunami
Sadao Abe as Pinko
Gekidan Hitori as Yamashita
Seiko Sakurada as Sato
Umika Kawashima as Tomo Sanada
Reina Fujii as Kana Yamaguchi

Reference

External links

 Official site 
 Daddy Loves Mommy Best in the TBS Program Catalog 

2006 in Japanese television
Japanese drama television series
2006 Japanese television series debuts
2006 Japanese television series endings
Nichiyō Gekijō
Television shows written by Kazuhiko Yukawa